RIKEN cDNA 4932414N04 is a protein that in the house mouse is encoded by the 4932414N04Rik gene. The gene is also known as RP23-459M13.1.

Model organisms
				
Model organisms have been used in the study of 4932414N04Rik function. A conditional knockout mouse line, called 4932414N04Riktm1a(KOMP)Wtsi was generated as part of the International Knockout Mouse Consortium program — a high-throughput mutagenesis project to generate and distribute animal models of disease to interested scientists — at the Wellcome Trust Sanger Institute.

Male and female animals underwent a standardized phenotypic screen to determine the effects of deletion. Twenty two tests were carried out on mutant mice, but no significant abnormalities were observed.

References

Further reading 
 

Mouse proteins
Genes mutated in mice